The 2008–09 UAE President's Cup was the 33rd season of the UAE President's Cup, the premier knockout tournament for association football clubs in the United Arab Emirates.

Al-Ahli went into this edition as the holders. Sharjah FC hold the most wins with 8 titles.

The cup winner were guaranteed a place in the 2010 AFC Champions League.

Round 1
24 teams play a knockout tie. 12 clubs advance to the next round. Ties played over 30 & 31 October 2008

Round 2

16 teams play a knockout tie. 8 clubs advance to the next round. Ties played over 28 & 29 November 2008

Quarter finals

8 teams play a knockout tie. 4 clubs advance to the next round. Ties played over 1 & 2 February 2009

Semi finals

4 teams play a knockout tie. 2 clubs advance to the Final Ties played on 24 February 2009

Final

13 April 2009

UAE President's Cup seasons
Uae Presidents Cup, 2008-09
President's Cup